Qian Julie Wang (Chinese: 王乾) is a Chinese-American writer and civil rights lawyer.

Early life 
Qian Wang was born in Shijiazhuang, China to academic parents. Wang's mother was a professor of mathematics, while Wang's father was a professor of English and critic of the government, which led to the family being persecuted. Wang's father fled China to the United States when she was five; Wang and her mother followed two years later in 1994. After their temporary visas expired, the Wang family remained in the United States as undocumented immigrants in Brooklyn. 

Wang's father enrolled her at P.S. 124 in Chinatown, but few of her classmates and teachers spoke Mandarin Chinese, thus isolating her even within a seemingly familiar community. Unable to speak English or Cantonese, Wang was initially placed in a special-needs classroom, but was returned to mainstream instruction after she was observed teaching herself to read English through picture books. After school, Wang worked alongside her mother in clothing sweatshops and a sushi processing plant. 

Wang's early talent for writing was mistaken as plagiarism by an elementary school teacher, prompting her to deliberately hide her abilities throughout much of her primary education. After several years in the US, Wang and her mother emigrated to Canada, in anticipation of better prospects, and her father followed sometime thereafter. Wang returned to the United States to attend Swarthmore College.

Her upbringing in poverty in America is the subject of Wang's breakout memoir Beautiful Country.

Career 
After graduating from Swarthmore College with a Bachelor of Arts in English Literature, Wang earned her juris doctor at Yale Law School in 2012. She worked as an associate at Kirkland & Ellis and as an appellate litigator within the New York City Law Department before moving to Robins Kaplan, where she was elected to partnership within two years of joining the firm. 

Wang declined Robins Kaplan's offer of partnership and currently serves as managing director/partner of Gottlieb & Wang LLP, a law firm focusing on special needs children and civil rights impact litigation. She decided to start writing her memoir, Beautiful Country, in the wake of the 2016 US election of Donald Trump as President of the United States. She had been a naturalized American citizen for six months by this time. 

Wang wrote the book on her phone during her commute to her law offices, finishing a first draft in 2019 and publishing in 2021. She is working on a second book inspired by her experiences as an Asian-American working in corporate law.

Personal life 
Wang chose the Anglicised name "Julie" because of Asian-American puppet "Julie Woo" on The Puzzle Place. 

Wang converted to Judaism, founding and leading a Jews of Color group at Manhattan Central Synagogue; on the day her debut memoir was released, Wang delivered a lay sermon to the congregation at Rosh Hashanah services. Wang is married.

See also 

 Chinese Americans in New York City
 List of Yale Law School alumni

References 

Chinese women writers
Chinese women lawyers
American women lawyers
American women writers of Chinese descent
Chinese Jews
Jewish women writers
Jewish American writers
Living people
1987 births
People from Shijiazhuang
Chinese emigrants to the United States
People with acquired American citizenship
21st-century American women writers
American women non-fiction writers
American lawyers
Yale Law School alumni
Swarthmore College alumni
Writers from Hebei
People associated with Kirkland & Ellis
Converts to Judaism
21st-century American Jews